Dhoom 3 is a 2013 Indian Hindi-language action thriller film written and directed by Vijay Krishna Acharya and produced by Aditya Chopra, who co-wrote the story. It stars Aamir Khan, Abhishek Bachchan, Katrina Kaif and Uday Chopra. It is the final installment of the Dhoom series and the sequel to Dhoom (2004) and Dhoom 2 (2006). 

The film features Abhishek Bachchan and Uday Chopra reprising their roles as protagonists Jai and Ali, while Aamir Khan plays the antagonist. Dhoom 3 was released on 20 December 2013, and was the first Indian film to be released in the IMAX motion picture film format with Dolby Atmos surround sound.

Dhoom 3 released on 20 December 2013, to mixed reviews from critics. It grossed  worldwide in just ten days, to become the highest-grossing Indian film of all time at that time, before becoming the first Indian film to cross . The film was screened during the 2014 International Film Festival of India in the Celebrating Dance in Indian Cinema section.

As of 2023, Dhoom 3 remains Uday Chopra's final film as an actor.

Plot 
In the year 1990, "The Great Indian Circus" owned by Iqbal Haroon Khan (Jackie Shroff) in Chicago, Illinois gets closed when he is unable to repay his loan. Sahir, his little son, pleads that the two would soon turn the corner. But Iqbal gets rejected and commits suicide in front of the heartless Chairman of Western Bank of Chicago Warren Anderson. Twenty-three years later, Sahir (Aamir Khan) robs various branches of the Western Bank of Chicago as revenge for what the bank did to his father. Despite all efforts of law enforcement, the Chicago police fail to foil the robbery and he successfully gets away. Detective Victoria (Tabrett Bethell) calls ACP Jai Dixit (Abhishek Bachchan) and his partner, Sub-Inspector Ali Akbar Fateh Khan (Uday Chopra), for help in solving the case. Jai baits Sahir into robbing again by making it known he is involved in the case and that the thief is an amateur. On the other hand, Sahir starts the Great Indian Circus again, which was closed due to Iqbal's death. That is where he appoints Aaliya Hussain (Katrina Kaif), a new acrobat in his circus. Sahir poses as an informant for Jai, and manages to gather information on the bank while giving Jai a lead to follow. Eventually, Sahir robs the bank and escapes, but Jai and Ali follow him. Jai, while hanging on a helicopter ladder, manages to shoot Sahir on the left shoulder before he disappears.

Sahir has a big premiere of The Great Indian Circus, with his female lead acrobat, Aaliya, involving a trick with him disappearing in one place and showing up in another. The show is a success, but afterwards, Jai, Ali, and the police surround him, knowing him as the thief. Jai says the proof will be the gunshot wound, but when Sahir is examined, there is no evidence anywhere on his body. It is then revealed that Sahir has an autistic twin brother, Samar, who helps him pull off the tricks and robberies, and was the one who sustained the wounds from Jai's gunshot.

Jai is fired from the case, but is encouraged by Ali to prove Sahir's guilt by going rogue. Jai eventually finds out about Samar, and sets about finding a way to corner Sahir. Samar, being mentally challenged, is kept in seclusion by Sahir. However, he allows Samar outdoors once a week, and Jai manages to befriend him during this time in order to perform his plan. Jai then has Anderson and the Chicago Police Department reassign him and Ali back on the case. He explains to them that the Western Bank of Chicago is being robbed in the form of vengeance due to the tragic events that took place about twenty-three years ago, and requests everyone cooperates to help bring the criminals in. Samar has fallen in love with Aaliya after performing with her in the circus, but cannot express it. This leads to a rift between the brothers. Jai tries to take advantage of this, but Sahir finds out and thwarts Jai's plan to stop them. When Sahir comes in the disguise of Samar, Jai reveals his true identity and, assuming him to be Samar, tells him to surrender since he can give them justice. When Sahir reveals himself, he ties Jai to the track of a roller coaster. He switches the roller coaster on, but Ali arrives in time to save him from being crushed. He decides the only way to catch the brothers is during a robbery. Sahir and Samar pull off their final bank heist, and escape. However, the following day, Jai manages to corner them at a dam as they make their way out of town. Samar is hesitant to run when Aaliya shows up, begging him to stop. Sahir surrenders to Jai, asking him to spare Samar. Jai agrees, but right after, Sahir attempts to jump off the dam. Samar grabs Sahir's hand, refusing to let him go. Sahir begs Samar otherwise, saying he can live freely with Aaliya. But Samar says that both of them are born together and should die together. Soon Samar loses his grip, and the two of them fall to their death into the abyss smiling at each other. Western Bank of Chicago is shut down as a result of the heists, while Aaliya is shown having taken over The Great Indian Circus and still performing for it.

Cast 
 Aamir Khan as Sahir/Samar Khan (dual role)
Siddharth Nigam as Young Sahir/Samar 
 Abhishek Bachchan as ACP Jai Dixit, Mumbai Crime Branch
 Katrina Kaif as Aaliya Hussain, Samar's love interest
 Uday Chopra as Ali Akbar Fateh Khan
 Jackie Shroff as Iqbal Haroon Khan, Sahir and Samar's father 
 Tabrett Bethell as Victoria Williams
 Andrew Bicknell as Warren Anderson
 Vikas Shrivastav as Tamilian Don

Production

Development 
Prior to principal photography, the film enjoyed widespread media coverage due to the tremendous box office successes of previous instalments Dhoom 2 and Dhoom, thereby creating anticipation amongst audience and media. On 2 January 2011, the producer of the previous Dhoom films Aditya Chopra, confirmed that the third instalment of the Dhoom series would begin principal photography by the end of 2011. Initially, the producers and the lead actor Aamir wanted to release the film on Christmas of 2012, but the plan was scrapped in favour of an early release date in 2013, mainly due to a forecast that a Christmas release would force a rushed post-production schedule, which was considered unfavorable given the high degree of technicality required for the film. Around  was spent just on the production side of Dhoom 3.

Reportedly, Chopra wanted to make the film in 3D after observing the successes of previous Bollywood films released in this format. However, actor Aamir Khan opined that the 3D technology needed expertise and was unsure of the outcome of its utilisation by the director. , YRF Studios had not announced the production of the film in 3D.

Casting 
Aamir Khan was signed on to play the lead antagonist, while Abhishek Bachchan and Uday Chopra were confirmed to reprise their roles as Jai Dixit and Ali Akbar respectively. Deepika Padukone was signed as the lead heroine, starring opposite Khan but was replaced by Katrina Kaif after Padukone backed out. Khan learned ballet, aerobatics and the French technique of parkour, a method of movement focused on negotiating obstacles with speed and efficiency, while Kaif took paragliding training and singing lessons. Bachchan reportedly lost nine kilos of weight to prepare for his role in the film. Rimi Sen, who played ACP Jai Dixit's (character played by Abhishek Bachchan) wife in the previous two instalments of the series, was not approached to play her character Sweety. However, she stated that she would not have reprised the role even if she were offered.

Unlike the first two Dhoom films directed by Sanjay Gadhvi, Vijay Krishna Acharya, the writer of all three instalments of Dhoom, was roped in to direct Dhoom 3. Olliver Keller was signed to direct the stunt scenes.

Aamir Khan stated in an interview that his role in Dhoom 3 is the toughest role so far in his life. The action scenes were directed by Conrad Palmisano and Sham Kaushal. In an interview with IANS, Abhishek Bachchan expressed how every character of Dhoom 3 is significant: "...Dhoom is my film and I am the hero. Nobody can take that away from me. You can be the biggest or the smallest star but Dhoom is about Jai and Ali. It is as simple as that. If the characters of Jai and Ali are not there in Dhoom, the film won't be there."

On 23 September 2013, three months before the actual release of the film, DNA and other media news publications revealed that Aamir Khan could play a double role in Dhoom 3, but they did not confirm it. The dual role was only confirmed at the release of the film. This made Dhoom 3 the first and currently the only film in the series in which the antagonist has a double role. However, this was not the first time the series featured a double role, since Bipasha Basu had a double role in Dhoom 2 as Shonali and Monali, but they did not share the same screen space, unlike Khan's characters.

Filming 

Filming was scheduled to commence from November 2011, with scenes involving Abhishek Bachchan and Uday Chopra being shot first, but the former was off on a paternity leave, so shooting was postponed to January 2012. The schedule was then pushed to June because of lead actor Aamir's prior commitments with his TV show Satyamev Jayate; in June, the filming schedule was further postponed for a month because Khan wanted to prepare himself for his role of a gymnast. Khan also wanted to concentrate on the marketing and promotion of his 2012 film Talaash. Without any further delays, filming commenced with Jackie Shroff and Siddharth Nigam, the child actor playing childhood Aamir Khan, on 8 June 2012 at Yash Raj Studios, Mumbai.

Aamir Khan joined the crew in July 2012, filming for five days at Yash Raj Studios and further continued to shoot in Chicago and other parts of the United States. Khan, Abhishek Bachchan, Uday Chopra flew to the US on 4 August 2012 to complete a three-month schedule. On arrival in India in December 2012, Bachchan stated that fifty percent of filming was complete and would again resume in Mumbai.

In the second week of March 2013, it was reported that the crew had departed to Zurich and Ticino, Switzerland to film the climax. The shooting of the film finally wrapped up on 14 September 2013 at a suburban studio in Mumbai.

The climactic scene in Dhoom 3 was shot at the famous arch dam, Contra Dam (commonly known as the Verzasca Dam) in Ticino, Switzerland. It is the same dam that became a popular bungee jumping venue after a James Bond stuntman jumped off it in the opening scene of the 1995 film GoldenEye.

Music 

It was announced that the composer of Dhoom and Dhoom 2; Pritam, would return once again to compose the music of the third instalment. Earlier reports suggested that Shefali Alvares had been roped to sing the Dhoom title track, but this turned out to be a rumour. Aamir said in a statement that the title track "Dhoom Machale Dhoom" is dedicated to Sachin Tendulkar who was then playing his 200th and final test match at the Wankhede Stadium.

Release 
In November 2013, Aditya Chopra sent out a message to movie exhibitors all over the country to "Go digital or miss Dhoom 3." In detailed statements, he claimed, "Release of movies through digital and UFO digital cinema prevents piracy as the prints are water-marked and finger-printed and can be traced back. It is believed that usually films are copied for piracy when the reels are being transported to theatres in the country and abroad. Digital cinema curbs piracy as the 'en route' content leakage is eliminated. It also makes sense economically as a producer saves a lot of print costs. Apart from that, encrypting the content protects the copyrights of the producers and distributors. Digital prints prevent duplication of prints and help by diverting funds back to the cinemas."

IMAX Corporation and Yash Raj Films announced that Dhoom:3 would be the first Indian local language production to be released in the IMAX format. The film was digitally remastered in the IMAX format with proprietary IMAX DMR (Digital Re-mastering) technology and was released in IMAX theatres across India and selective global locations. Dhoom 3 was released with cinema sound technology Dolby Atmos. The film received a native Atmos mix at YRF Studios. Dhoom 3 was given a 12A certificate by the British Board of Film Certification for Moderate Violence 12 December 2013, for Moderate violence. The film was released across 4500 screens in India (inclusive of Tamil and Telugu versions) along with 750 screens overseas. Dhoom 3 had a release on 250 screens in West Bengal. The maximum ticket price of the IMAX version of Dhoom 3 was Rs 900 (US$15) in India. Cinépolis Pune set a unique record by hosting 54 shows of Dhoom 3 on 20 December 2013. Dhoom 3 was also released in non-traditional overseas markets like Egypt, Peru, Germany and Malaysia. Dhoom 3 was slated to release in China on 25 July 2014. This was to be the widest release ever for an Indian film in China, with 2000 screens across 400 cities.

Marketing

Pre-release 

The title logo of the film was released in a video that credited the main roles of the film. The score for the video constituted paced beats and electric guitars and was released on Christmas 2012 through Yash Raj Film's official YouTube channel, confirming the film for a Christmas 2013 release. The first working as well as promotional poster was also released nearly a year prior. In August 2013, YRF released a motion poster of the film on YouTube, revealing the first look. It featured Aamir Khan with a hidden visage standing inside a tall building, looking at helicopters in the air through a glass window. A voiceover reveals that the Chicago police force is searching for a fugitive biker who vanished before he could be caught.

The first teaser of Dhoom 3 was released on 5 September 2013 at 12 noon IST. The teaser achieved 6 million views on YouTube within 6 days, subsequently receiving 12 million views in 20 days. The film's teaser was also attached with the film Shuddh Desi Romance. On 25 October, Yash Raj Films launched a game based on the film for Windows Phones. Developed by 99Games Online (a subsidiary of Robosoft mobile games), the 3D game was set against the backdrop of Chicago and opens with a heist by the character played by Aamir Khan. Within 20 days of its launch, the game witnessed over 1 million downloads on the Windows Phone Marketplace and Nokia Store. The Android, iOS and Blackberry 10 version of the game was launched on 19 November 2013. Dhoom: 3 The Game crossed five million downloads across all platforms in less than seven weeks of its launch on 19 November 2013. Dhoom:3 mobile game surpassed 10 million downloads within three months since its release.

The theatrical trailer was released in IMAX format on 30 October 2013 as well as on YouTube. PVR Cinemas began advance booking for selected shows of the film same day the trailer had released, witnessing sales of just under  until 17 December 2013.

Aamir Khan also promoted Dhoom 3 on the sets of Kaun Banega Crorepati. The publicity campaign included tie-ins with over 17 leading brands including Mattel (manufacture of limited edit action figures, model cars and bikes), Gulf Oil, CEAT, Bombay Dyeing, Archies for stationery and the LINE social messaging application, along with 183 other brands. A marketing pact was also made with BMW Motorrad, which has revealed that its S1000RR and K1300R sport bikes would feature in the film. A special screening of Dhoom 3 was held at Yash Raj Studios on 19 December 2013. A special screening of Dhoom 3 that was attended by Raj Thackeray was organised on 22 December 2013.

Post-release 
After the film's performance at the box office, Amul paid a tribute to the film in one of its creative advertisement campaign posters. The poster features the words "Dhoom Tea" in the same typography style as the film's logo is with a caption "Chased everyday". "The Dhoom Anthem" featuring Saba Azad was released by Yashraj Films on 26 December 2013. A Spanish version of "Dhoom Machale" song sung by Mia Mont was released by Yashraj Films on 4 January 2014. In June 2014, 99GamesOnline launched the sequel to 'Dhoom: 3 The Game' mobile game, title as "Dhoom:3 Jet Speed".

Box office 

Dhoom 3 grossed over  worldwide in its first three days, including its Tamil and Telugu versions. The film grossed  worldwide in just ten days, to become the highest-grossing Indian film of all time. On 6 January 2014, Yash Raj Films issued a statement that Dhoom 3 is officially the first Indian film to earn  worldwide. The film's final worldwide gross was  crore (US$101 million), including 372 crore (US$64 million) in India and US$35.6 million (217.2 crore) overseas.

Domestic 

According to several trade publications, Dhoom 3 opened to an overwhelming response at the domestic box office. Box Office India stated that the film had an extraordinary opening, recording 75% occupancy in multiplexes and 90–100% occupancy in single screens.

The total opening day collection of the film broke the records of highest non-holiday opening and highest single day previously held by Yeh Jawaani Hai Deewani and Krrish 3 respectively. On the second day of its release, it went on to collect , setting new records in several circuits. The film set new first week records in all circuits and became the highest grossing film in the East Punjab circuit at the end of its first week.

Dhoom 3 set new records in all territories across the globe apart from Mumbai, the biggest circuit. Of its collections,  nett was from single screens in India. Dhoom 3 broke all records of 3 Idiots in domestic market, except Mumbai territory.

Overseas 
Dhoom 3 grossed US$10.32 million in its first weekend, setting new records for an Indian film in almost all territories. Dhoom 3 grossed  total in overseas markets. Dhoom 3 became the highest-grossing Indian film ever in the US/Canada, UK, Gulf, Australia and New Zealand. The film grossed over £2 million in the United Kingdom in 11 days, and went on to gross £2,708,046 to become highest-grossing Hindi film in the UK. It also became the UK's highest-grossing foreign-language film of 2013, highest-grossing foreign-language Indian film of all time, and tenth highest-grossing foreign-language film of all time. The film collected $3,423,508 (204.9 million) in its first weekend in the United States and Canada. Dhoom 3 collected US$20.5 million internationally in ten days. Dhoom 3 eventually grossed US$28 million in international markets in its lifetime overseas theatrical run and surpassed the record of 3 Idiots to become the highest grossing Bollywood film in international markets.

Dhoom 3 also set a new opening record in Pakistan, beating the previous record held by Pakistani film Waar. Dhoom 3 eventually became the highest grossing Bollywood film in Pakistan with overall gross of US$1.95 million (INR 121 million, PKR 245 million). Dhoom 3 became the first film to gross Rs 60 million at the box office in Nepal, as the local filmmakers of Nepal had to delay the release of their own films for three weeks due to the strong performance of Dhoom 3 there. Dhoom 3 had the biggest opening ever for any Indian film in Turkey, when it released there in June 2014.

China 
The film was released in China on 25 July 2014, 8 months after the release of the film in India and other overseas markets. Dhoom 3 reportedly had the widest release in China for a Bollywood film in more than three decades. The film opened in 2,000 screens in 400 Chinese cities, upon release it entered the Chinese top 10 charts at number 9 and grossed $1.35 million for the three-day weekend, beating the local Chinese romance No Zuo No Die.

Records

Critical reception

India 
Domestically, Dhoom 3 received mixed reviews from critics. Taran Adarsh of Bollywood Hungama rated the film 4.5 out of 5 stars and said, "On the whole, DHOOM-3 is one solid entertainer loaded with attitude and star power that will leave fans of the series salivating for more." The Daily Bhaskar also rated it 4.5 out of 5 stars. While praising the performance of Khan, the newspaper wrote "The whole film rests on Khan's shoulders, and it won't be an overestimation to say that he is strong enough to hold the three hours all by himself." Mohar Basu of Koimoi gave the film 4 out of 5 stars and stated that it is "spectacular and majestic". Srijana Mitra Das of the Times of India gave the film 4 out of 5 stars. Especially praising the actors' performances, she wrote, "Dhoom 3 makes you laugh, gasp – even sniffle". Aparna Mudi of Zee News gave the film 4 out of 5 stars and remarked "Dhoom 3 manages to deliver a typically Bollywood revenge saga in a modern way." Sarita A Tanwar of Daily News and Analysis also gave it 4 stars and commented, "Welcome to the world of jaw-dropping action and stunts never seen before on Hindi screen. Dhoom 3 redefines the word 'entertainment' in the grandest way possible." Saibal Chatterjee of NDTV, on the other hand, gave it 3 out of 5 stars and noted that "Dhoom: 3 is a high-voltage action flick that relies squarely on known methods of the genre". Sukanya Verma of Rediff.com gave it 3 out of 5 stars and wrote, "Dhoom 3 continues the tradition of extravagance in adventure and expenditure by roping in the fastidious Aamir Khan as its latest star antagonist". Rachit Gupta of Filmfare rated it 3 out of 5 stars; though he labelled it a "slick looking film", he felt "the force driving them, the story, teeters on abysmal points". Anupama Chopra of the Hindustan Times gave the film 3 stars and wrote, "The third installment...is bigger and more plot-heavy than the first two." The Indo-Asian News Service review, syndicated by Business Standard, also gave it 3 stars, writing, "Dhoom 3 is an intriguing piece of work... slender supple smart and subtle...and yet helmed by a central performance that screams for attention."

Dhoom 3 also received negative reviews as well. Rajeev Masand of CNN-IBN gave the film 2.5 out of 5 stars and stated "Dhoom 3 is let down by a convenient script and its inability to deliver solid entertainment". He described the film as a "sloppily scripted sandwich of hammy acting and cheesy dialogue" that lacked the "thrills" of the previous films. Raja Sen of Rediff gave it 1.5 out of 5 stars. Criticizing the villain's motivations and the "yawn-worthy chase scenes" that were "both pointless and badly edited", he deemed Dhoom 3 "a children's film made for children who've never seen a film". Shubhra Gupta of Indian Express gave the film 2 stars out of 5. Although he praised the "superb cinematography, great-looking sets, expansive foreign locations", he found the film to be "a victim of both a crying lack of imagination and franchise fatigue". Gupta also felt that Khan lacked the "sexy-badness" required for the villain, and noted Kaif's minimal role. Rohit Khilnani of India Today heavily criticised Dhoom 3 and gave it 2 stars out of 5, calling it "full of loopholes, over-the-top acting and an overdose of action that doesn't fit well all the time". He found that the film's only redeeming factor was that it was "a visual treat" due to its exotic locales and special effects. Rafay Mahmood of The Express Tribune rated the film as 1.5 out of 5, noting the "overdose of one-liners", lack of "a properly connected cause-and-effect chain", and the "over-the-top action sequences" that "build-up to nothing dramatically significant". He, in particular, criticised the actors' performances. Mahmood called Kaif "eye candy" with little dialogue, and felt Khan gave "perhaps the worst performance of his career".

International 
Meanwhile, the film garnered praise from foreign film critics. Review aggregator Rotten Tomatoes gives the film a score of 72% based on reviews from 18 critics, with a rating average of 6.91/10.

David Chute of Variety liked the camera work, action, stunts and Aamir's performance: "Acharya's camera seems to be dancing – and swooning – along with the performers.... High-flying acrobatics and a standout Aamir Khan performance dominate the third entry in Bollywood's biggest action franchise." According to Bill Stamets of Chicago Sun-Times, "Dhoom:3 is crowd-pleasing populist fare" that "entertains as a spectacle of chases, bank capers, magic acts and song-and-dance numbers". A number of critics noted that Dhoom 3 has several similarities with Christopher Nolan's films The Prestige and The Dark Knight.

Awards and nominations 

The film has garnered the inaugural Telstra People's Choice Award at the 2014 Indian Film Festival of Melbourne.

See also 

 Dhoom (film series)
 List of Bollywood films of 2013
 Bollywood 100 Crore Club
 List of highest-grossing Bollywood films
 List of Bollywood highest-grossing films in overseas markets

References

External links 
 
 
 
 

2010s Hindi-language films
2013 action thriller films
2010s chase films
2013 films
Circus films
Fictional portrayals of the Chicago Police Department
Fictional portrayals of the Maharashtra Police
Films about autism
Films featuring songs by Pritam
Films set in Chicago
Films shot in Chicago
Films shot in Mumbai
Films shot in Switzerland
Indian action thriller films
Indian chase films
Indian vigilante films
Indian films about revenge
Indian sequel films
Techno-thriller films
Telstra People's Choice Award winners
Twins in Indian films
Yash Raj Films films
Films about bank robbery
IMAX films
2010s vigilante films
Films about Indian Americans
Films shot in the United States
Films set in the United States
Indian heist films
2010s English-language films
Foreign films set in the United States